J series may refer to:
Fujifilm FinePix J series
Gibson J series
Juniper J series
Honda J engine
Jeep Honcho
QI (J series), the tenth season of the TV quiz show QI
Samsung Galaxy J series, a series of cell phones
Sony Ericsson J series, a series of cell phones
TADIL-J, J-series messages in a military data protocol

See also
 I series (disambiguation)
 K series (disambiguation)